Haileybury Astana is a British independent school in Astana, Kazakhstan. It was founded in 2011  as an offshoot of Haileybury, an independent school in England, and follows the creation of Haileybury Almaty in 2008. Haileybury Astana is a British curriculum private school in Astana, where education is built in the best traditions of a British education. In senior school pupils are prepared for the International Baccalaureate (IB) Diploma Programme, which allows graduates to enrol in the best universities in the world.

In 2018, Haileybury Astana opened the IB student centre for Year 12-13 International Baccalaureate Diploma Programme (IBDP) students. Haileybury Astana graduates are recognised in both Kazakhstan and world renowned universities. We have received many offers from Russell Group Universities in the UK. All Haileybury Astana graduates have successfully completed an IB diploma, scoring an impressive average of 34 points, while the world average is 29.8. 

Our students received 100% grants (tuition and living costs) from universities such as Korea Advanced Institute of Science and Technology (KAIST), National University of Singapore (NUS), Vassar College, New York, and Bocconi University, Milan, Italy.

Every year Haileybury Astana allocates 10 full scholarships for students entering Year 12 to study the International Baccalaureate Diploma Programme (IBDP).

References

Educational institutions established in 2011
International schools in Kazakhstan
Schools in Astana
2011 establishments in Kazakhstan